Michel Gigon (born 1929 in Caen, Calvados) is a French painter and stained-glass window designer. He began his artistic career in 1953.

Work
Gigon had many exhibitions in France, Germany, Switzerland, Japan and Poland. Many of its paintings are in private collections in France, Switzerland, Germany, Spain.
 Caen museum one painting.
 Rennes museum severals drawings.
 Arts et Lettres management of Paris one drawing.
 Kłodzko museum (Poland) one painting.
 CES Marcel Proust school at Illiers-Combray (Eure-et-Loir) one painting.
 Saint Germain l’Auxerois church Paris, one painting.

Michel Gigon's stained-glass windows in France

North of France 
Pas-de-Calais Courset, Chapelle du foyer de charité
Pas-de-Calais Saint-Omer, Chapelle de la Malassise « Ecole »
Pas-de-Calais Wisques, Abbaye des Moniales « Eglise »
Nord Aulnoye, Eglise Saint-Eloi
Nord Haumont, Eglise Saint-Michel
Nord Mont-des-Cats, Eglise paroissiale

Paris area
Yvelines Andrésy, Parish church
Yvelines Bois d’Arcy, Parish church
Aisne Château-Thierry, Saint-Crépin church
Val d'Oise Hodent near Magny-en-Vexin, stained-glass windows for an old monastic farm

In Normandy
Seine-Maritime Le Havre, CES Viviani, dalle de verre
Calvados Goustranville, Parish church
Manche Bricquebec, Abbaye Notre Dame de Grâce
Manche Canville la Roque, Eglise Saint Malo (to see painting « Transfiguration »)
Manche Cosqueville, Parish church
Manche Tamerville, Parish church

South of France
Lot Bovila, Parish church
Lot Rouillac, Parish church related to Montcuq
Lot Saint Geniez, Parish church related to Montcuq
Bouches-du-Rhône Aix-en-Provence, Chapelle du séminaire
Alpes-Maritimes Saint Honorat island, Lérins Abbey

See also
Ardennes Dom-le-Mesnil, Parish church
Charente-Maritime Saint-Sauvant, Parish church
Eure-et-Loir Dreux, school of la Sablonnière, stained-glass window and mosaic
Morbihan Arzal, church of Lantierne

Bibliography
 Revue Vitrea: Vitrail - Verre - Architecture - Le vitrail français moderne
Revue du centre international du vitrail - n° 4 - 2eme semestre 1989
ISSN 0991-0131
Page 52: Les peintres et le vitrail

About Michel Gigon
 Monograph "Michel Gigon"
Jil Silberstein, preface from André Frossard (1980).
 Le vitrail français contemporain
Françoise Perrot - Centre international du vitrail - Chartres
Edition: L'oeil & la main - La manufacture

Diffusion LA MANUFACTURE 1984
Page 68
 Le vitrail Contemporain "Comme un chant de lumière"
Jean-Marie Geron - Albert Moxhet
Edition: Dexia - La renaissance du livre

Collection Références
Pages 18, 146, 147
 Revue: Exposition - Un siecle de vitrail en picardie
association
Monuments de picardie
April 1987
 L'Homme nouveau - Number 1411 - December 22sd 2007
Pages 4, 5
Portrait "Un artiste déconcertant"
Geneviève Bayle

External links 
  a few works from Gigon
  drouot-cotation: other works
  Arte Comunicarte

20th-century French painters
20th-century French male artists
French male painters
21st-century French painters
21st-century French male artists
French abstract artists
French stained glass artists and manufacturers
1929 births
Living people